Keezer is a surname. Notable people with the surname include:

Dexter Keezer (1895–1991), American economist and academic administrator
Geoffrey Keezer (born 1970), American jazz pianist

See also
Leezer